The 2009 Catalunya Formula Two round was the eighth and final race of the 2009 FIA Formula Two Championship season. It was held on 31 October and 1 November 2009 at Circuit de Catalunya in Montmeló, just outside Barcelona, Spain. The first race was won by Andy Soucek, with Mikhail Aleshin and debutant Tristan Vautier also on the podium. The second race was also won by Soucek, with Nicola de Marco and Robert Wickens also on the podium. Edoardo Piscopo missed this round to participate in the first round of 2009–10 GP2 Asia Series season in Abu Dhabi. His slot was filled by Formula Palmer Audi driver Vautier. Carlos Iaconelli also missed out on the round, due to flu.

Classification

Qualifying 1

Qualifying 2

Race 1

Race 2

Standings after the race
Drivers' Championship standings

References

FIA Formula Two Championship